Enniscorthy Greyhound Stadium is a greyhound racing track located on the west side of Enniscorthy, County Wexford, Republic of Ireland.

Racing takes place every Monday and Thursday evening and race distances are 350, 525, 550, 575, and 600 yards. The track is described as a wide galloping track with a sharp rise from the last bend to the winning line. The feature competition at the track is the Red Mills Future Champion Unraced Stake.

History
Although racing officially started on 3 August 1933 there was sporadic racing earlier at this venue. Eight businessmen got together and formed the track. The first directors were Denis O’Brien, James McCrea, William Stamp and Tim Larkin, in addition Doctor Bowen, P.J.O’L James McCrea, William Stamp and Tim Larkin, in addition Doctor Bowen, P.J.O’Loughlin, R McCrea helped found the track. Race nights for many years were on Monday and Thursday evenings and the racing and betting market remains as one of the strongest despite the remote location.

Board membership has been family affair over the years with ties to the original board members such as Paul McCrea, Mary Stamp, Harry Larkin, Billy Stamp, Barbara Teehan and Mary Nolan, the latter two are grand-daughters of Denis O’Brien and Tim Larkin respectively. Another relation the late Kay Prendergast (daughter of O’Brien) was a director and Ireland's first female timekeeper.

The Racing Managers over the years have been Pat White, Peter Agnew, Sean McCrea, John McCrea and Stephen Cullen. The main races run at the track have been the Grand Prize, the Leinster Puppy Cup, Wexford Leger and more recently the Future Champion Unraced Stake. There have been many famous greyhounds to appear here; Mile Bush Pride and Palms Printer both began their careers at Enniscorthy as did the greyhounds with the Monalee prefix.

Track records

Current

Former track records

References

External links
Greyhound Racing Ireland

Greyhound racing venues in the Republic of Ireland